The 1918 California gubernatorial election was held on November 5, 1918. William Stephens had defeated James Rolph for the Republican nomination.

Primary election
San Francisco mayor James Rolph, a Republican, cross-filed in both the Republican and Democratic primaries, won the Democratic primary, and received the most overall votes of any candidate in the primary election across all parties. However, because he failed to win his own party's nomination, he was barred from receiving the Democratic nomination thanks to the 1917 Hawson amendment to California electoral law, leaving the Democratic Party without a candidate. Incumbent Republican governor William Stephens won the Republican, Prohibition, and Progressive nominations. The only other primary candidate to advance to the general election was Socialist Henry H. Roser, running unopposed.

|-
! scope="col" colspan="5" style="width: 15em" |Democratic primary
|-

|-
! scope="col" colspan="5" style="width: 15em" |Progressive primary
|-

|-
! scope="col" colspan="5" style="width: 15em" |Prohibition primary
|-

|-
! scope="col" colspan="5" style="width: 15em" |Republican primary
|-

|-
! scope="col" colspan="5" style="width: 15em" |Socialist primary
|-

|-
! scope="col" colspan="5" style="width: 15em" |Primary total
|-

General election results

References
 Our Campaigns

Gubernatorial
California
1918
November 1918 events